Resistance Is Futile  may refer to:

Resistance Is Futile (album), a 2018 studio album by the Manic Street Preachers
"Resistance Is Futile" (Dexter), a 2007 broadcast episode of Dexter
Resistance Is Futile (Oh Hiroshima), a 2012 studio album by Oh Hiroshima
Resistance Is Futile!: How the Trump-Hating Left Lost Its Collective Mind, 2018 book by Ann Coulter
"Resistance is futile", a phrase uttered by the Borg in Star Trek